Prosun Azad is a Bangladeshi actress. She started out her career with Lux Channel I Superstar competition in 2012, and won the first runner-up title.

Career
Azad started her career with the Lux Channel I Superstar in 2012. She finished third in the competition. Her first film was Ochena Hridoy by Shafiqul Islam Khan, and her second film was Shorbonasha Yabaa co-starring Kazi Maruf. She criticized Bangladesh films for largely catering to the male view. She appeared in the television film Keno Megh Ashe in July 2015 on NTV.

In May 2015, she starred in Ochena Hridoy. She co-starred with Arifin Shuvo in the movie Mrittupuri. She started her directorial career with Khuhelika in January 2016. She co-starred in Oshomapto Script on Maasranga Television in February 2016. In May 2016, she starred in Jibito O Mrito on Maasranga Television. She had a guest appearance in the action movie Musafir. In January 2017 she started in the television film Neelpori Neelanjona.

Ban
In December 2016, Azad had gotten into a fight with director Rokeya Prachy. After the spat Prachi filed a complaint with the Director's Guild of Bangladesh. The Guild banned their members from working with Azad for one year. Azad expressed indifference. She was also banned two other trade body, the Programme Producers Association of Bangladesh and Abhinayshilpi Shangh.

Filmography

Television
 Mukhosh Manush (2011, Guest Appearance)
 Apartment 5D (2015)
 Unknown Love (2015)

References

External links

 
 

Living people
Bangladeshi film actresses
21st-century Bangladeshi actresses
People from Dhaka
Year of birth missing (living people)